Ponte Eiffel is a multi-level road–rail bridge crossing the Lima River in Viana do Castelo, Portugal. It was designed by Gustave Eiffel.

The structure is a candidate to the classification as a National Monument.

See also
List of bridges in Portugal

References

Further reading

Bridges in Viana do Castelo District
Lima River
Buildings and structures in Viana do Castelo